The 2021 European Individual Speedway Junior Championship was the 24th edition of the Championship. A major change took place before the 2021 Championships in that the age limit was reduced from under 21 years of age to under 19 years of age. Three qualifying heats took place in Nagyhalász (22 May), Holsted (19 June) and Pardubice (26 June).

The final was staged on 7 August, at Riga in Latvia and was won by Francis Gusts of Latvia.

Final
 7 August 2021
  Riga

Run-Off For Silver: Hellstrom-Bangs beat Cierniak

See also 
 2021 Speedway European Championship

References

Individual Speedway Junior European Championship
European Junior Championship
International sports competitions hosted by Latvia